Rowville is a suburb in Melbourne, Victoria, Australia, 27 km south-east of Melbourne's Central Business District, located within the City of Knox local government area. Rowville recorded a population of 33,571 at the 2021 census.

Rowville is named after the Row family, whose property Stamford Park was established in 1882. The Stamford Park homestead has been restored in recent years by Knox Council. Geographically, Rowville is one of the largest suburbs south-east of Melbourne. Rowville Post Office opened on 20 December 1905 and closed in 1987. In 1989 it reopened in the new Stud Park (formerly Darryl Park) Shopping Centre.

Rowville developed rapidly over the 1980s and 1990s, especially in terms of housing and light industrial activities. Culturally, Rowville is still developing, like many of Melbourne's outer suburbs. Development has included the construction of the Wellington Village shopping centre on Wellington Road, complementing the Rowville Lakes shopping centre on Kelletts Road. Rowville has many estates including the prestigious Sovereign Crest Estate and the older Timbertop Estate. Sovereign Crest Estate covers is a  medium-sized estate which includes homes located on parts of Karoo Road, in particular 130–above.

Stud Park Shopping Centre, opened in 1989, is the largest in the suburb. It houses the Rowville branch of the Eastern Regional Library, and is adjacent to the Rowville Community Centre under the Clock Tower. The Stringybark Festival is held at the centre every third weekend of October each year and attracts over 25,000 visitors. The event is organised by the Knox Council, and is one of Australia's longest running sustainability event. There are three golf courses within Rowville. Stud Park is currently getting an expansion.

Rowville is at the intersection of many local government areas with the suburb connecting to suburbs within the Shire of Yarra Ranges, City of Monash, City of Greater Dandenong, City of Casey and City of Knox.

Education

Rowville has one dual-campus high school, Rowville Secondary College, with an Eastern Campus (7–12) and a Western Campus (7–12). Students from the Eastern Campus used to move to the Western Campus to complete their VCE. But now they can complete VCE at the eastern campus as well.

There are 4 government primary schools, Rowville Primary, Karoo Primary School, Heany Park Primary and Park Ridge Primary, and one Catholic Primary School, St. Simons the Apostle Primary School. When Lysterfield Primary School was relocated to its present site, it was in Rowville, however the boundary between the suburbs has changed and Lysterfield Primary is once again in Lysterfield.

St. Simons Primary School celebrated their 25th anniversary in 2007.

Karoo Primary School celebrated their 20th anniversary in 2012.

Rowville Primary celebrated its 40th Birthday in 2013.

Transport

Rowville is currently a heavily car-dependent community, with many families having at least two cars. This is unlikely to change, without the addition of significant improvements to public transport serving the area, such as greater bus frequencies and coverage. The Rowville railway line, has long been called for, but lacks political commitment. Light rail connections to the north and south would also help reduce car-dependency. Three or four cars per household are not uncommon, depending on the number of children of driving age still living at home. 70% of residents drive cars to work.

The current State Government has proposed that the public transport problems will be resolved by the SmartBus system, which includes special bus lanes on major traffic routes.  One SmartBus route, connecting Rowville to Caulfield via Monash University and Huntingdale Station has been established, with the other providing a link to Melbourne Airport and Frankston which began operation in 2008.

Commerce

Rowville's main centre of commerce is Stud Park Shopping Centre located on the corner of Stud Road and Fulham Road. It contains a Coles, Woolworths, Kmart, and over 60 specialty stores including two hairdressers, a pharmacy, two travel agents, banks, a vet and assorted food outlets. It has approximately 1500 car park spaces and is serviced regularly by bus services.

Wellington Village, located at 1100 Wellington Road, is Rowville's second largest shopping centre. It contains an IGA, Aldi, Bendigo Bank, Biggin & Scott Real Estate, a butcher, a vet, a bakery, a pharmacy, a hairdresser and assorted food outlets.

Rowville Lakes is a third, smaller shopping centre on Kelletts Road. It contains an IGA, a pharmacy, a real estate agent, a hairdresser, and various food outlets.

Home to manufacturing and distribution of major Australian Corporations of Parmalat, Sigma Pharmaceuticals, Jeld Wen, Regal Senoit Australia, Twinings, Darrel Lea Chocolates, Matthews, Australia Post stamp printing, Callaway Golf, D4J, Johnson Controls, Brilliant Lighting, Cold Xpress and Eaton.

Sport
 Rowville Football Club in the Eastern Football League
 Rowville Knights Community Football Club in the Eastern Football League
 Lysterfield Junior Football Club in the Eastern Football League
 Rowville Cricket Club in the Ferntree Gully District Cricket Association
 Eildon Park Cricket Club in the Ferntree Gully District Cricket Association
 Lysterfield Cricket Club in the Ferntree Gully District Cricket Association
 Rowville Eagles Soccer Club
 Knox United Soccer Club located in Karoo Rd
 Knox Churches Soccer Club
 Blue Park on Sovereign Crest Boulevard
 Eildon Park Tennis Club
 Rowville Tennis Club
 Rowville Netball Club
 Aston Athletic FC
 Rowville Little Athletics Club
 Rowville Lakes Little Athletics Club
 Bird Pigeon Racing Club on Victoria Knox Ave
 Belly Dancing Classes at Eildon Park Cricket Club by Dimmies
 Turtle Collection on Pickworth Crescent
 Wheel of Fortune Champion of Candlebark Quadrant
 Rowville Rockets Basketball Club  
 Lysterfield Netball Club
 KLD all stars cheerleading and dance
Omega Trampoline Sports Club

Golfers play at the course of the Kingston Links on Corporate Avenue, at the course of the Tirhatuan Park Golf Club on Police and Stud Roads or at the course of the Waverley Golf Club on Bergins Road.

Community service groups

Rowville is supported by local community groups; including the 1st Rowville Scout Group since 1972, being based in an architectural marvel of its Scout Hall since 1991.

Governance

Federal
Rowville is in the Federal Division of Aston which is held by Alan Tudge MP of the Liberal Party.

State
Rowville is in the State Lower House seat of Rowville which is held by Kim Wells of the Liberal Party.

Council
Rowville is part of the City of Knox and has three ward councillors representing it.

 Taylor Ward – Darren Pearce
 Friberg Ward – Susan Laukens
 Tirhatuan Ward – Nicole Seymour

See also
2012 Rowville Rail Study
Rowville Training Camp

References

Suburbs of Melbourne
Suburbs of the City of Knox